Clerys was a long-established department store on O'Connell Street in Dublin, Ireland, a focal point of the street. The business dates from 1853, however the current building dates from 1922, having been completely destroyed in the 1916 Easter Rising. Clerys completed a five-year restoration programme in 2004 at a cost of €24 million. A renovation project is currently underway to restore the building and will include converting the layout from that of a department store to that of various businesses operating under the same roof.

The group also included three "At Home With Clerys" homewares stores in out-of-town retail parks at Blanchardstown, Leopardstown and Naas; and the discount department store Guiney and Co (a different company to the Guineys chain) at 79-80 Talbot Street; all of which closed during the 2012 receivership. There had formerly been a fashion-only outlet in The Square, Tallaght but this had already closed by the time of the receivership.

Ownership
The history of Clerys began in May 1853 when Mac Swiney, Delany and Co. opened ‘The New or Palatial Mart' on the site of the present store in what was then Sackville Street. In 1883, the premises was taken over and renamed by M. J. Clery (died 1896), a native of Bulgaden, Co. Limerick. William Martin Murphy was also involved in the business.

Clerys was bought out of receivership in 1941 by Denis Guiney (1893–1967) for £250,000. The receivers were Craig Gardner & Co.
Denis Guiney died in 1967, and his widow (née Mary Leahy) continued to be chairperson until her death on 23 August 2004 at the age of 103 years.

Clerys was placed into receivership on 17 September 2012. Receivers Paul McCann and Michael McAteer of Grant Thornton said the store’s future could be secured.

Closure
Kieran Wallace and Eamonn Richardson were appointed joint provisional liquidators to OSC Operations Limited (the "Company") trading as Clerys, on 12 June 2015. The company ceased to trade with immediate effect.

Staff were given 30 minutes' notice to pack up and leave, some had worked there for over 40 years. Clerys sold for €1.00, the building itself sold for €29 million to the Natrium Investment Group, with Paddy McKillen's Oakmount and Europa Capital coming on board to redevelop the site, with architects Henry J Lyons, trying to keep as much of the original design (based on Selfridges' in London) as possible.

Clerys Quarter
Clerys is being redeveloped into a mixed-use development of offices, retail and leisure called Clerys Quarter. Press Up Entertainment (run by Paddy McKillen Jr and Matt Ryan, and known for a number of pubs, bars and hotels as well as Wowburger and Tower Records Ireland) will operate a boutique hotel which will be called The Clery, with the hotel also including a rooftop bar and a restaurant.

Clerys Clock
A large clock with two faces hangs above Clerys' central doors on O'Connell Street (opposite the statue of Jim Larkin). "Under Clerys' clock" is a well-known rendez-vous, both for Dubliners, and visitors from the countryside, and is famous in the city's culture as a place where many romances begin. 1990, on the fiftieth anniversary of Denis Guiney taking over the store, a new clock was installed.

Guiney and Co
Guiney and Co was Clerys' discount department store located at 79-80 Talbot Street, not far from one of Guineys' Dublin stores at 83 Talbot St. Even though the two stores were run by separate companies, the latter chain was founded by a nephew of Denis Guiney called Michael, who had been working as the buyer of household goods and furnishings at Clerys, before setting up his own Dublin store in 1971.

See also
 List of Irish companies

References

Further reading
 Costello, Peter. (1992). The very heart of the city: The story of Denis Guiney and Clerys, Clery and Co.

Commercial buildings completed in 1922
Retail companies established in 1853
Department stores of Ireland
Shops in Dublin (city)
1853 establishments in the United Kingdom
1850s establishments in Ireland
Clothing retailers of Ireland
Companies based in Dublin (city)
2015 disestablishments in Ireland
Retail companies disestablished in 2015